"Längesen" is a single by Swedish Rap artist Petter, featuring vocals from Veronica Maggio. It was released in Sweden as a digital download on 28 June 2010. The song peaked at number 20 on the Swedish Singles Chart.

Music video
A music video to accompany the release of "Längesen" was first released onto YouTube on 24 June 2010 at a total length of four minutes and thirty-four seconds.

Track listing
Digital download
 "Längesen" (feat. Veronica Maggio) - 4:33

Charts

Weekly charts

Year-end charts

Release history

References

2010 singles
Veronica Maggio songs
2010 songs
Songs written by Veronica Maggio
Universal Music Group singles